Chloride is a onetime silver mining camp in Mohave County, Arizona, United States, and is considered the oldest continuously inhabited mining town in the state. The town is a census-designated place (CDP), with a population at the 2020 census of 229. Chloride has a ZIP Code of 86431.

History

Prospectors first located mineral resources in the area in the 1840s, including silver, gold, lead, zinc, and turquoise. Chloride was founded about 1863, but mining was not widespread until the 1870s, after a treaty was signed with the Hualapai Indians. The Arizona and Utah Railway, running to the site from Kingman, was inaugurated on August 16, 1899 – the last silver spike was driven by Miss May Krider. The town eventually grew to a peak of around 5,000 inhabitants, and at one time Chloride was the county seat. By 1917 the population had fallen to 2,000, and by 1944 it was nearly a ghost town. A small grave-yard remains just west of town.

American author Louis L'Amour visited Chloride sometime between 1927 and 1929 after the Weepah, Nevada, goldrush, where he had bought, and then sold, a claim for $50. During his visit the town of Chloride caught fire. L'Amour assisted the town citizens in a bucket brigade that ultimately failed to stop most of the town from burning to the ground.

Chloride's population was 135 in the 1960 census.

Climate
According to the Köppen Climate Classification system, Chloride has a cold desert climate, abbreviated "BWk" on climate maps.

References

Further reading

External links

 Chloride – ghosttowns.com

Census-designated places in Mohave County, Arizona
Populated places established in 1863
Census-designated places in Arizona
1863 establishments in Arizona Territory
Ghost towns in Arizona
Cemeteries in Arizona